The Congress of Afrikan people (CAP) was a proponent of black nationalism. Active in the 1970s, CAP's ideology was set around Maoist theory and practice. Its activities illustrate fluidity and changing nature of black radicalism in this period. It later became the Revolutionary Communist League (Marxist-Leninist-Mao Tse-tung Thought), led by Amiri Baraka, which merged into the League of Revolutionary Struggle (Marxist-Leninist). When this group split, some of the members went into Freedom Road Socialist Organization.

References

External links
 Congress of African Peoples

International organizations based in Africa